Sander (formerly known as Stizostedion) is a genus of predatory ray-finned fish in the family Percidae, which also includes the perches, ruffes, and darters. They are also known as "pike-perch" because of their resemblance to fish in the unrelated Esocidae (pike) family. They are the only genus in the monotypic tribe Luciopercini, which is one of two tribes in the subfamily Luciopercinae,

Characteristics
The species within the genus share canine-like teeth that are at their largest in the zander, and although they are not present in adult Volga pikeperches, they do possess them as juveniles. in addition, they have thin rows of teeth on their jaws, vomer, and palatines, the preopercle shows strong serrations along its edges,  a continuous lateral line  reaches all the way from the head to the caudal fin, and this is flanked by additional lateral lines, one each on the upper and lower lobes of the deeply forked caudal fin. Further features in common include the absence of genital papillae, seven or eight branchiostegal rays, 12–13 soft rays in the anal fin, and the eye has a reflective layer behind the retina, known as a tapetum lucidum, which is an adaptation for seeing in low-light conditions. The species in the genus Sander are largely piscivorous as adults.

Species
The genus includes these species:
 Sander canadensis Griffith & Smith, 1834 (sauger)
 Sander lucioperca Linnaeus, 1758 (zander)
 Sander marinus G. Cuvier, 1828 (estuarine perch)
 Sander vitreus Mitchill, 1818 (walleye)
 Sander volgensis J. F. Gmelin, 1789 (Volga pikeperch)

Phylogeny
Phylogenetic relationships of the species of genus Sander based on the concatenated data set of six gene regions and a Bayesian analysis. Romanichthys valsanicola is the nearest living relative of the genus Sander and is used as an outgroup to root the tree.

This is not universally accepted, though, and the asprete (Romanichthys valsanicola) has been more recently placed within the genus Zingel.

Two clades are within the genus, a Eurasian one and a North American one, which separated from a common ancestor around 20.8 million years ago (Mya) in the Miocene, when the North Atlantic Land Bridge connecting Europe to eastern North America subsided. The Eurasian clade then speciated from 13.8 Mya, while the two North American species speciated around 5.4 Mya.

References

External links
 FishBase list of Sander species
 UN: True Name for Pike Perch

Luciopercinae
Freshwater fish genera
Freshwater fish of Europe